Amar Deep is a 1958 Indian Hindi-language romantic drama film directed by T. Prakash Rao, under Sivaji Productions. The film stars Dev Anand, Vyjayanthimala, Padmini, Ragini, Johnny Walker, Pran, Om Prakash. The film's music was composed by C. Ramchandra. It is a remake of 1956 Tamil movie Amara Deepam which itself was a remake of the 1942 English-language film Random Harvest which had earlier been adapted in Bengali as Harano Sur (1957).

Plot
The movie story deals with Aruna who lives a wealthy lifestyle with her grandfather. She has come of marriageable age and he wants her to marry a young man named Pran. But Aruna finds him possessive, controlling, and hot-tempered, and will not have anything to do with him, so she decides to run away. Her father, who falls deeply ill, asks Pran to search everywhere for her, and Pran takes an oath that he will not return home until he finds her. When Aruna was away from home, she meets an young man named Ashok, who is jobless but has a good heart and they both fall in love with each other. One day, when they were going for a walk, Pran finds Aruna and drags her back home. Ashok runs after Aruna but gets into an accident causing him to lose his memory. Shortly thereafter, her father's health gets complicated and passes away, leaving her in the care of Pran and a servant named Hariya. When Pran offers to marry her, she refuses and tells him that she loves Ashok. Ashok, who doesn't even remember his name, saves the life of a street dancer named Roopa and they fall in love. One day, Roopa and her family of street dancers along with Ashok perform in front of Aruna's house. Aruna recognizes Ashok but he doesn't recognize her which makes her very sad and heartbroken. The rest of the story gets complicated when Ashok gets his memory back and remembers Aruna and forgets Roopa who turns out to Meena's (now Aruna's) elder sister and is shot by Pran in a rescue attempt of Aruna who is kidnapped by Pran.

Cast
 Dev Anand as Ashok
 Vyjayanthimala as Meena / Aruna
 Padmini as Roopa
 Ragini as Champa
 Johnny Walker as Ustad
 Pran as Pran
 David as Meena and Roopa's Father 
 Bipin Gupta as Meena's Foster Grandfather
 Mukri as Lalli
 Shivraj as Hariya
 Om Prakash as Conned Man
 Anwar Hussain as Conman 	
 Randhir

Soundtrack
Music was by C. Ramchandra. Lyrics for all songs were written by Rajinder Krishan.

Production 
Amar Deep is the first film produced by Sivaji Films (later renamed Sivaji Productions).

References

External links 
 

1958 films
1950s Hindi-language films
Films scored by C. Ramchandra
Films directed by T. Prakash Rao
Indian remakes of American films
Hindi remakes of Bengali films
Hindi-language romance films